Uruguay national under-23 football team (also known as Uruguay under-23, Uruguay U-23, Uruguay Olympic football team) represents Uruguay in under-23 international football competitions such as the Olympic Games and Pan American Games. The selection is limited to players under the age of 23, except three overage players. The team is controlled by the Asociación Uruguaya de Fútbol (AUF).

History

1924-1988
Uruguay's first participation in the Olympics was in Paris, France, in 1924. In that year, Uruguay won its first gold medal, beating Yugoslavia 7–0, United States 3–0, France 5–1, Netherlands 2–1, and in the Final defeating Switzerland 3–0.

Uruguay's second participation in the Olympics was in Amsterdam, Netherlands, in 1928. In that year, Uruguay won its second gold medal, beating Netherlands 2–0, Germany 4–1, Italy 3–2,  and in the first Final tying Argentina 1–1, and defeating Argentina 2–1 in the second final.

During this time, Uruguay Olympic football team is technically Uruguay national football team.

1992-present 
Since 1992 Olympics, the football event was changed into a tournament for under 23 team with a maximum of three overage players.

Era of Uruguay national under-23 football team began in earnest,

Olympic record

Pan American Games record

Matches

Summer Olympics

Paris 1924

First round

Second round

Quarter-finals

Semi-finals

Gold Medal match
In the other semi-final between Switzerland and Sweden the Swiss prevailed. In the final the Swiss proved no match, ultimately, for the Uruguayans whose two goals in the second half put paid to their opponent's ambitions, Uruguay eventually prevailing 3–0.  Interest in the final had been considerable, such was the draw of the Uruguayan side; 60,000 watched and 10,000 were locked out.

Amsterdam 1928

First round

Quarter-finals

Semi-finals

Gold medal match

Recent and future matches

Players
The following 23 players were called up to the final squad for 2020 CONMEBOL Pre-Olympic Tournament.
Caps and goals correct as of 10 February 2020, subsequent to the match against Colombia.

Honours 

Summer Olympics:
  Gold medalists (2): 1924, 1928
Pan American Games:
  Gold medalists (2): 1983, 2015
 Bronze medalists (1): 2011
 Fourth place: 1963
 South American Games:
  Silver Medalists (1): 2018
 CONMEBOL Pre-Olympic Tournament:
 Runners-up (1): 1976
 Third place (3): 1968, 1992, 1996
 Fourth place (1): 2000
Copa Mercosur:
Winners: 1996

See also
Uruguay national football team
Uruguay national under-20 football team
Uruguay national under-17 football team

References

External links
 

 
South American national under-23 association football teams
Uruguay at the Summer Olympics